Let Me Come Over is the third album by American alternative rock band Buffalo Tom. It was released on March 10, 1992, by RCA Records, Situation Two and Beggars Banquet Records.
The cover art is taken from an issue of National Geographic and shows an Aboriginal Australian stockman.

Track listing
All songs written by Chris Colbourn, Bill Janovitz, and Tom Maginnis.

 "Staples" – 3:35
 "Taillights Fade" – 3:44
 "Mountains of Your Head" – 3:22
 "Mineral" – 4:32
 "Darl" – 2:50
 "Larry" – 5:32
 "Velvet Roof" – 3:55
 "I'm Not There" – 4:06
 "Stymied" – 4:18
 "Porchlight" – 4:09
 "Frozen Lake" – 3:45
 "Saving Grace" – 3:14
 "Crutch" – 4:03

Personnel
Buffalo Tom
Chris Colbourn – bass, vocals
Bill Janovitz – guitar, vocals
Tom Maginnis – drums

Charts

References

Buffalo Tom albums
1992 albums
Albums produced by Paul Q. Kolderie
Albums produced by Sean Slade
Beggars Banquet Records albums
Situation Two albums